Linus Johansson (born 30 November 1992) is a Swedish professional ice hockey forward who is currently playing for Färjestad BK in the Swedish Hockey League (SHL).

Johansson played in the Kontinental Hockey League (KHL) after serving as captain in his first tenure with Färjestad BK of the SHL.

Career statistics

Regular season and playoffs

International

Awards and honours

References

External links
 

1992 births
Living people
Swedish ice hockey centres
Djurgårdens IF Hockey players
Färjestad BK players
Mora IK players
HC Neftekhimik Nizhnekamsk players
Olofströms IK players
IK Oskarshamn players
HC Sochi players
Storhamar Dragons players
IF Troja/Ljungby players
Ice hockey players at the 2022 Winter Olympics
Olympic ice hockey players of Sweden